Eric Carmen is the debut album by American rock and roll musician and singer-songwriter Eric Carmen. It is also his first of two self-titled albums, the other released in 1984. It peaked at No. 21 on the Billboard album chart upon its release in 1975, the highest position of his career, and generated the No. 2 pop single "All by Myself" in the same year.  The song reached No. 1 on the Cashbox and Record World charts.  The album also included two follow-up Top 40 hits, "Never Gonna Fall in Love Again" (#11), and "Sunrise" (#34), both of which charted in 1976.

All tracks were written by Eric Carmen except the Drifters' song "On Broadway", which was written by Barry Mann, Cynthia Weil, Jerry Leiber and Mike Stoller.  This LP also contained Carmen's original version of "That's Rock and Roll", which became a No. 3 hit for Shaun Cassidy in 1977.

The album was Carmen's first solo production after leaving the Raspberries, a power pop group which scored several Top 40 hits in the early 1970s.

Track listing
All compositions by Eric Carmen with the exception of "Never Gonna Fall In Love Again", whose melody he borrowed from Russian composer Sergei Rachmaninoff's Symphony No. 2 in E minor, "All By Myself", with elements from Rachmaninoff's Piano Concerto No. 2 in C minor, and "On Broadway", which was written by Barry Mann, Cynthia Weil, Mike Stoller and Jerry Leiber. The uptempo Track number 6, "My Girl" — not to be confused with the well-known Temptations hit from 1965 — also exploits a theme from Rachmaninoff's Piano Concerto No. 2.
 "Sunrise" – 5:21
 "That's Rock 'n' Roll"  – 3:10
 "Never Gonna Fall in Love Again" – 3:45
 "All by Myself" – 7:11
 "Last Night" – 2:57
 "My Girl" – 3:02
 "Great Expectations" – 3:03
 "Everything"  – 2:01
 "No Hard Feelings" – 5:40
 "On Broadway" – 3:26

Personnel
Eric Carmen - lead vocals, guitar, keyboards
Dan Hrdlicka - lead guitar, backing vocals
Steve Knill - bass, backing vocals
Richard Reising - synthesizer, organ, backing vocals
Dwight Krueger, Michael McBride - drums, percussion, backing vocals
Jackie Kelso - uncredited flute solo on "Never Gonna Fall in Love Again"
Hugh McCracken - slide guitar solo on "All By Myself"
Technical
Jack Sherdel - engineer
Robert L. Heimall - art direction, design
Norman Seeff - photography

Charts

Singles

Year-end charts

References

Eric Carmen albums
1975 debut albums
Albums produced by Jimmy Ienner
Arista Records albums
Rhino Records albums